The Snake Stone is the second in a series of detective novels by Jason Goodwin, featuring the eunuch Yashim. It is set in Constantinople in 1838. The novel was nominated for a Macavity Award.

Plot
Detective, polyglot, chef, eunuch--Investigator Yashim returns in this evocative Edgar® Award–winning series set in Constantinople towards the end of the Ottoman Empire

Constantinople, 1838. In his palace on the Bosphorus, Sultan Mahmud II is dying and the city swirls with rumors and alarms. The unexpected arrival of a French archaeologist determined to track down lost Byzantine treasures throws the Greek community into confusion. Yashim Togalu is once again enlisted to investigate. But when the archaeologist’s mutilated body is discovered outside the French embassy, it turns out there is only one suspect: Yashim himself. As the body count starts to rise, Yashim must uncover the startling truth behind a shadowy society dedicated to the revival of the Byzantine Empire, encountering along the way such vibrant characters as Lord Byron's doctor and the Sultan's West Indies–born mother, the Valide. With striking wit and irresistible flair, Jason Goodwin takes us into a world where the stakes are high, betrayal is death--and the pleasure to the reader is immense.

2007 British novels
Historical crime novels
Fiction set in 1838
Novels set in the 1830s
Novels set in Istanbul
Novels set in the Ottoman Empire